The Bayard Taylor Memorial Library is located in Kennett Square, Pennsylvania and is part of the Chester County Library System.  The library was dedicated on Sept. 24, 1896, named in honor of Bayard Taylor, and opened to the public on Sept. 28 with a few periodicals and empty shelves.

References

External links

Libraries in Pennsylvania
Libraries established in 1896
1896 establishments in Pennsylvania